Adrian "Fletch" Fletcher is a fictional character from the BBC medical dramas Casualty and Holby City, portrayed by Alex Walkinshaw. He first appears in Casualty series 26 episode "Zero Sum Game", first broadcast on 7 July 2012. Fletch is originally a staff nurse in Holby City Hospital's emergency department (ED). The character is portrayed as fun, likeable, charming and a Jack the lad; he considers his family very important. Fletch's backstory states that he was a mechanic, before retraining as a nurse after the Great Recession. Researchers consulted with the Royal College of Nursing, who said the scenario was realistic. Fletch's most prominent storyline in Casualty sees him begin a "slow-burning" affair with senior nurse Tess Bateman (Suzanne Packer). The characters' relationship was explored further in a special episode, "Mistletoe and Rum". Writers focused on Fletch's marriage to Natalie Fletcher (Claire Cage) as it began to dissolve and she isolates him from his children. They reconcile when Natalie gives birth. Other stories while appearing in Casualty include taking the blame for Tess' medical error, being promoted to senior staff nurse and a gambling addiction.

Walkinshaw announced in April 2014 that he would be leaving Casualty to join Holby City. After saving Tess from a train explosion and having their affair exposed to Natalie and his colleagues, Fletch leaves in the series 28 episode "Falling – Part Two", first broadcast on 29 June 2014. Fletch joins Holby City in the series 16 episode "Star Crossed Lovers", first broadcast on 12 August 2014. He is appointed ward manager of the Acute Assessment Unit (AAU). His backstory connects him to Colette Sheward (Louise Delamere) as her former fiancée. Fletch's home life was explored in 2015 when he becomes a single father following Natalie's death. He struggles financially and briefly becomes involved in criminal dealings. Fletch guest appears in Casualty thirtieth anniversary episode in 2016, starting a new story where he becomes temporarily paralysed after being stabbed.

Producers paired Fletch with Jac Naylor (Rosie Marcel) in 2017 for a long-running story, as well as creating a love triangle between him, Jac and Abigail Tait (Olivia Poulet) the following year. Further exploration of the character's background began in July 2018 when his father Steven Fletcher (Jesse Birdsall) joined the cast. Other Holby City stories include a friendship with Raf di Lucca (Joe McFadden), which is tested by their feelings for Noami Palmer (Lorna Brown), clashing with Sydney Somers (Gemma Oaten) after receiving her father's inheritance, and being promoted to the director of nursing. Fletch has generally been well received by critics and fans, with Walkinshaw also receiving a nomination for Best Actor at the 2015 TV Choice Awards. Fletch will make a cameo in Casualty during the episode airing on 2 April 2022 talking to Charlie about the death of Jac.

Casting 
On 13 March 2012, it was announced that actor Alex Walkinshaw had joined the regular cast as nurse Adrian "Fletch" Fletcher. Walkinshaw began filming in March, which he looked forward to. Executive producer Johnathan Young expressed his joy at Walkinshaw's casting and commented, "He's brings bags of talent, a wealth of experience and a cheeky sense of humour to rival Fletch's!" Before joining Casualty, Walkinshaw starred as Dale Smith in crime drama The Bill, which also featured several Casualty cast members. Walkinshaw found this reassuring as he could rely on these people if he struggled with anything.

Three actors, who were deemed suited to the part, were invited to audition for the role of Fletch. After speaking to some of the show's crew and performing a screen test, Walkinshaw was cast as Fletch. Walkinshaw was attracted to the role of Fletch because he differs from the roles that Walkinshaw has previously played. He liked the role of Fletch and his journey within the series. Walkinshaw enjoyed filming in Cardiff, where the drama is filmed. He signed a year-long contract.

In 2017, Walkinshaw expressed his enjoyment at portraying Fletch and said that he did not want to leave the role. He commented, "I'd stay till all my hair falls out and I have a Zimmer frame." The actor added that he never wanted to not enjoy portraying the character and suggested he could quit when he decides that he does not enjoy it any more. Young actor Aaron Mullen portrays Fletch in a flashback appearance during the twentieth series episode "Best Christmas Ever".

Development

Characterisation and family 

Fletch is billed as "the ultimate cheeky chappy" who enjoys sport, drinking alcohol and women. Fletch is nice, fun, charming and flirtatious. His likeable personality makes him popular amongst staff and patients alike. Walkinshaw described Fletch as "quite a nice, rounded bloke who's very happy to be around". He told Patrick McLennan of What's on TV that Fletch is a "wheeler-dealer" with the easy ability to talk to people, making him popular. On the character, series producer Nikki Wilson commented, "You'll see a real charm, energy and playfulness from his character, which is absolutely joyous." Young's executive producer successor, Oliver Kent, said that Fletch has a "unique blend of warmth and blokiness". Walkinshaw described his character as "a laugh and a bit of a jack the lad". Jonathan Phillips, one of the show's story producers, called Fletch an "alpha male, laddish" character. A What's on TV reporter described Fletch as a "cheeky graduate" who is "super confident". Walkinshaw liked Fletch's characterisation, specifically his "cheeky chappy" persona and his occupation. He thought that Fletch would be a character that the audience could relate to. He felt that he and Fletch were similar and revelled in the opportunity to portray a friendly character. In a later interview, Walkinshaw said that he was a more serious person than Fletch as his character is very "high-energy, always moving" and he had to be more serious at home. Wilson loved the character, calling him "brilliant". Walkinshaw was handed a description of his character when he joined the series which he and producers developed after he began filming. He liked the working relationship between himself and show bosses when it came to developing the character. When filming, Walkinshaw will try to stay as his character's personality to avoid having to regain his character repeatedly. While he described this technique as "exhausting", he believed that regaining his character multiple times over the course of filming would be more tiring.

Fletch is a staff nurse at Holby City Hospital's emergency department (ED), a job which he enjoys since he likes learning new skills and meeting new people. Walkinshaw thought that Fletch suited his job. Fletch wants to bring some light-hearted fun to the ED team. Fletch likes working in the hospital because it reminds him of happy memories and his family. Walkinshaw explained that although Fletch is new to the nursing profession, he has plenty of life experience, which helps him in the job. He described Fletch as "a very competent nurse" and a fantastic addition to the team of ED staff. He told a BBC Online reporter that Fletch has the "maturity" not commonly associated with recently qualified nurses. Wilson pointed out that Fletch adds "a real sense of humour" to the ED's nursing staff. Walkinshaw explained that Fletch pushes people's limits with his humour. Lisa Spencer-Blackshaw, the senior nursing advisor at Holby City, said that Fletch resembles most male nurses and opined that he is a great nurse.

Fletch does not struggle when dealing with nervous and stressed patients. He will always go "the extra mile" for his patients and is described as "your go-to if you need straight-talking advice". Walkinshaw told Sue Haasler, writing for the book Holby City: Behind the Screen, that Fletch is the "glue between people" and said that he would emotionally support others as he felt it was as important as treating patients. He believed that Fletch's personal problems provide him with "emotional authority". Walkinshaw said that he struggled with the medical terminology as he is not medically capable. He practised bandaging with his children at home. He told Laura-Jayne Tyler of Inside Soap that he preferred wearing Fletch's nursing scrubs to the police uniform that he wore on The Bill. Walkinshaw believed that while he would be good at the bedside manner nurses use, he would struggle with the practical side of the job. Fletch is promoted to senior staff nurse in July 2013 and is a ward manager when he joins Holby City. A BBC Online reporter stated that Fletch's "executive title" does not prevent him from "getting his hands dirty and managing from the front line". Fletch is a good manager and is able to "work miracles on a dwindling budget". As an approachable person, Fletch knows everything about the nurses on his team.

Despite his fondness of women, Fletch is loyal towards his wife Natalie Fletcher (Claire Cage), who was originally named Keila, and their three children, Evie, Mikey and Ella. Walkinshaw thought Fletch's loyalty made him "all the more attractive". He explained that Fletch enjoys flirting but also enjoys returning home to his family so would not want to betray them. Walkinshaw told Daniel Kilkelly of entertainment website Digital Spy in June 2012 that he wanted Fletch's family to be introduced on-screen. He added that he believed they would make an appearance on the show. When he joins Holby City, Fletch is billed as "a proud and protective single dad to four beautifully demanding kids". Walkinshaw told What's on TV reporter Victoria Wilson that Fletch's children are his "happy place" and they mean "absolutely everything" to him. He explained that Fletch's children give him the confidence to do what needs to be done. He added that while Fletch's decision are not always the best, they are done for good reason.

Backstory and introduction 

Fletch's backstory states that he was a car mechanic running his own business until the Great Recession, when he was forced to close his garage. At the time, Fletch and Natalie were expecting their third child and needed financial support. After being supported by the nursing staff in the ED while his daughter was born at the hospital, Fletch decided that he would join the nursing profession. The show spoke to the Royal College of Nursing, who told them that many people decide to become ED nurses in later life. A BBC Online contributor dubbed Fletch "a little older than your average band 5 nurse".

Fletch makes his first appearance in the twenty-sixth series episode "Zero Sum Game", broadcast on 7 July 2012. His first scenes were previewed in a promotional trailer for episodes 31-42, released on 12 April 2012. When Fletch arrives, staff nurse Lloyd Asike (Michael Obiora) is assigned to be his mentor. Fletch misses his induction with Lloyd because he is fixing clinical nurse manager Tess Bateman's (Suzanne Packer) car. Lloyd is shocked when he meets Fletch as he is expecting a young nurse who will be "slightly more impressionable". Fletch's confidence surprises Lloyd, who becomes wary of Fletch. Fletch and Lloyd treat Amy Harris (Nikki Sanderson), a young woman who is suspected to be pregnant. Walkinshaw explained that Fletch views Amy as a child and wants to be "supportive". It emerges that she is not pregnant and Fletch has to tell her some bad news, which he does not like doing. On this, Walkinshaw commented, "He finds that really hard and that's something he's going to have to learn how to cope with." This experience helps Fletch understand that he cannot become emotionally involved in patient lives. Walkinshaw did not want to watch his first episode live as he struggles with nerves and was worried about the audience reaction. Wilson confirmed that Fletch's introduction would build towards a bigger focus on the ED's nursing staff during series 27.

Friendships 

Fletch gets along well with his colleagues, who like his fun personality. However, he clashes with mentor Lloyd. Fletch realises how humourless Lloyd is, so decides to tease him. Walkinshaw explained that Fletch's actions are not out of spite and that Fletch wants to "get past the seriousness of Lloyd". He predicted that Fletch and Lloyd would eventually become friends. When talking to his colleagues, Fletch does not differentiate between them and is not concerned about their level of authority. However, when he is working in resus, Fletch always respects the fact that the consultants are in control of the situation. Walkinshaw commented that when Fletch is in regular surroundings, "he's not worried whether you're the boss or not." Fletch will speak to everyone in the same way because he finds that it is "a good leveller". Fletch discovers that consultant Zoe Hanna (Sunetra Sarker) is single and questions her about it. On this, Walkinshaw explained that Fletch is only having a laugh with Zoe and is not prying for information.

Walkinshaw expected Fletch to develop friendships with the characters on Holby City. He told Katy Moon of Inside Soap that Fletch would get along with all of his colleagues, similarly to his time on Casualty, as they enjoy his personality. Jaye Jacobs reprised her role as nurse Donna Jackson in June 2017 and clashes with Fletch upon her return. Jacobs and Walkinshaw previously worked together as an onscreen couple in Waterloo Road, so she dismissed any chance of romance between the pair. Before Donna left, she was the AAU's ward sister, a role which Fletch now holds. Donna struggles to be told what to do by Fletch and wants to "pick up where she left off". Jacobs explained that Donna "tramples on a few toes" as she returns. Donna returns while the hospital staff are grieving following the death of doctor Jasmine Burrows (Lucinda Dryzek). She returns with an energy that annoys Fletch; Jacobs told Sarah Deen of the Metro that Donna's energy is "slightly misplaced" and that she enjoyed portraying the tension between Fletch and Donna. However, the pair eventually establish a friendship after Donna opens up to Fletch about her personal life.

Affair with Tess Bateman 
Ahead of his introduction, Walkinshaw said that Fletch and Tess would become friends when Tess becomes drawn to Fletch's humorous personality and his ability to create laughter in the ED. David Butcher of the Radio Times pointed out that Tess responds differently to Fletch than other people. He stated that when Fletch winks at Tess, she smiles at him rather than "[responding] with a basilisk stare and stern lecture". Producers devised a new storyline for Fletch and Tess when their friendship turns into an affair. Walkinshaw thought the storyline was natural and described it as an "honest, slow-burning development". The actor revealed that the storyline would feature "a lot of pain and struggle for Fletch and Tess." Off-screen, Walkinshaw and Packer are friends and discuss their intimate scenes beforehand. He did not mind portraying them. In the months after Fletch's introduction, there is a display of "chemistry" between the two characters.

Fletch and Tess' relationship is explored in a special episode, entitled "Mistletoe and Rum", made available to watch on BBC Red Button on 15 December 2012. The special follows Fletch and Tess on the ED nurses' Christmas night out. However, their evening is disrupted when they discover Tyron, a homeless man who needs emergency treatment when he goes into a hypoglycaemic coma, and have to treat him. Young thought that the special episode would create "an ideal opportunity" to explore Fletch and Tess' relationship before it began in the following months. Cast member Sarker directed the special, which she described as "a treat for all the fans that follow the show".

Gemma-Leah Devereux joined the cast as "self-assured" student nurse Aoife O'Reilly in January 2013. Fletch is assigned to be Aoife's mentor and she soon develops romantic feelings for him. Fletch does not realise this so Tess tries to warn him, but he brushes off her concerns and insists that he is "a father figure" to Aoife. Tess does not approve of Fletch's behaviour around Aoife, who she deems "an impressionable nurse". Fletch realises the truth when Aoife leaves him a Valentine card and after speaking to Aoife about her actions, Fletch is forced to "endure a tense shift with an embarrassed Aoife and watchful Tess." When Tess discovers that Fletch has spoken to Aoife, she agrees to go for a drink with him and at the end of the night, Fletch and Tess kiss. A What's on TV journalist wondered whether this would spark the start of an affair for the characters.

After Tess becomes involved in a stabbing incident, she is followed home and physically threatened. Fletch predicts what may happen and goes to Tess' home, where he finds her "scared and emotional". Walkinshaw explained that at that point, Fletch and Tess realise that they have "strong feelings for each other". Fletch and Tess then have sex. Walkinshaw pointed out that it has taken the couple some time to reach this point. As part of the storyline, Fletch's home life is explored. Walkinshaw felt that this was vital for the story as it gives the audience "a clearer picture". He explained that Fletch adores his children and does not want to lose that relationship, but his relationship with Natalie is changing. Tess later discovers that she is pregnant with Fletch's child and tries to tell him before goes on holiday with his family. As she prepares to tell him in her office, Natalie arrives with his children so Tess does not get a chance to speak with him. Walkinshaw stated that the story has several "interesting twists and turns". He added that he was enjoying the story because it pairs two characters that are not expected to be paired.

Tess does not tell Fletch about her pregnancy and terminates it. She avoids Fletch, but when they eventually speak, Tess ends their relationship. Zoe later realises that they have been in a relationship after noticing the tension between them at work. The following week, Natalie arrives in the ED to see Fletch but is admitted after fainting. Tess treats Natalie and discovers that she is pregnant. After Tess is admitted to the ED, Fletch discovers that she had a termination and is upset. Fletch tells Tess that he loves her, but she replies that she does not feel the same, devastating him. Afterward, Fletch decides to focus on his marriage.

Allegations 
Writers created another story for Fletch when he takes the blame for Tess' medical mistake. When Tess discovers that Natalie is pregnant, she becomes "distracted" at work. She treats another patient, Peter Trenton (Graham Turner), but administers the wrong drug, leaving him "[fighting] for his life". Tess goes home, unaware of her mistake, and Fletch covers for her by replacing her initials on the notes with his. Tess is surprised to discover that Fletch made the error and he confesses that he covered for her because he blames himself for her distraction. Following the error, Fletch faces a tribunal and Tess struggles to cope, "distraught" that her actions could mean that Fletch loses his job. At the end of his shift, Fletch discovers that he has only been cautioned by the HR department.

Two months later, Peter returns to the department after being admitted again. Fletch believes that Peter is being abused by his partner, Matt Marston (John McAndrew), who becomes "defensive" and accuses Fletch of attacking Peter when he was previously in hospital. Fletch admits that they spoke outside the hospital where Peter fell over, but he did not attack Peter. Matt calls the police and they arrest Fletch after reviewing the CCTV footage of their argument. The police charge Fletch with assault. On New Year's Eve, Fletch witnesses an explosion at a bar where Peter is inside and enters the burning building to save him. Paramedic Jeff Collier (Matt Bardock) helps Fletch and Peter and they escape the bar. Thankful to Fletch for saving his life, Peter drops all charges against him.

Breakdown of marriage 
Writers decided to focus on Fletch and Natalie's marriage by having her discover his affair. She arrives at the ED when Fletch has to stay for an extra shift, suspecting Fletch of having an affair. Fletch reassures Natalie that they have a strong marriage, but he eventually reveals that he had an affair with a colleague, but claims that it was with a nurse who has left the hospital. Walkinshaw thought that Natalie would "absolutely devastated" if she discovered that Fletch had an affair with Tess. Natalie ejects Fletch from the family home and later warns him away from the family so he explains to his "heartbroken" children that he will not spend Christmas with them. Walkinshaw had previously teased the scenes in an interview with Inside Soap, describing them as "heartbreaking" and "very emotional". He revealed that the scenes had "stayed with [him] for days afterwards". The actor added that he had "an inkling" about what the scenes would involve, but it became apparent that they were harder to film that he first thought. Walkinshaw has named the scenes as his hardest scenes to film on multiple occasions, stating that since he has children himself, he felt that it had a big impact on him. After saying goodbye to his children, Fletch is "overcome with regret and remorse". A What's on TV journalist pointed out that Fletch believes that "he's pretty certain life can't get any worse".

Fletch plans to take his children out for the day and is annoyed when Natalie cancels the plans and argues with her. Walkinshaw noted that Fletch and Natalie's separation is having a strain on the children's lives, making them "upset and disjointed by it". The argument causes their daughter Evie Fletcher (Sarah Staniforth) to run away, causing "blind panic at her disappearance". Fletch goes in search of Evie and finds her in an abandoned house. When he enters the house, the ceiling collapses and Evie becomes injured and stuck. Walkinshaw enjoyed filming the on-location scenes as he liked the "smash and grab" environment in comparison to the calmer scenes in the hospital. He also liked the challenge of filming stunts as "big lumps of things are falling through ceilings". When he left Casualty, Walkinshaw said that he enjoyed this stunt as it "looked and sounded great".

While Natalie is en route to the ED, she is involved in a car crash which creates worry for her unborn child. The crash makes Fletch realise that he should focus on his family and that he should not have had an affair. He and Natalie then decide to rebuild their marriage. Walkinshaw explained, "The tragedy of potentially losing two of their children forces Fletch and Natalie to make some big decisions." Natalie decides to rebuild their marriage with support from Tess and asks Fletch to move back into the family home. Walkinshaw stated that this is "obviously very difficult" for Tess due to her feelings for Fletch. With Tess having helped the marriage, Walkinshaw thought that Natalie would feel "really hurt and betrayed" if she discovered the truth because Tess has "lied to her by backing up Fletch's story." Natalie is later admitted to the ED in labour and Tess is forced to deliver the baby. Afterward, there are complications with the baby and Zoe has to resuscitate him.

Gambling addiction 
Fletch became the subject of a gambling addiction storyline in April 2014. The storyline begins when Fletch begins having "playful bets" with registrar Caleb Knight (Richard Winsor), but he later starts online gambling. Cal then suggests to Fletch that he tries spread betting on the stock exchange, which requires a £500 starting stake. Walkinshaw explained that Fletch "doesn't really think it all the way through" so is happy to accept Cal's invitation to spread betting, despite it being too expensive for him. However, Fletch realises what he has done when he loses his money, which is one month's mortgage payment. Walkinshaw said that Fletch "finds himself into a bit of a pickle!" He explained, "Rather than stopping, Fletch thinks he can get out of this by spending more money. But he digs himself a deeper and deeper hole!" Walkinshaw teased that the storyline would not end well for Fletch. Fletch tries to earn his money back by working extra shifts at the ED, which makes him "exhausted". When Tess realises, she warns him and says he is not allowed any more overtime. Fletch then accepts a second job as a taxi driver. Walkinshaw said that Fletch has to find the lost money which leaves him under strain. He added, "He makes things difficult for himself and lots of other things happen." Tess becomes suspicious of Fletch and he admits that he has a second job, leaving Tess "unimpressed".

Departure 
On 1 April 2014, it was announced that Fletch would be leaving Casualty to join its spin-off series, Holby City. Walkinshaw stated that Fletch leaves for a new challenge after his affair with Tess is revisited. He revealed that what happens with the story means that Fletch has to leave. The executive producer of both shows, Oliver Kent, said that Fletch and Walkinshaw had been "a wonderful asset to Casualty" and he was looking forward to him joining Holby City. Walkinshaw decided to leave Casualty to be closer to his family after two years on the show. When he informed the producers, they asked him to join Holby City. He was sad to leave the show and said he would miss his colleagues, who he hoped to stay in touch with. Reflecting on his character's storylines, Walkinshaw said that he enjoyed portraying the lighter material, but also liked the "agonising" material. He added that he was happy to have filmed so many stunt scenes as nurse characters rarely leave the setting of the show.

Fletch's exits in the series twenty-eight episode "Falling – Part Two", broadcast on 29 June 2014. In the episode, Tess is involved in a train crash. The train crash serves as a catalyst for Fletch's departure from the series. Phillips, who produced the episode, wanted to place Fletch and Tess' relationship at the center of the episode. He decided to create "a sense of what is at stake" for the characters. The crew struggled to find a location suitable for the train crash as many organisations did not want the show to derail trains and "blow them up" on their railways. They visited multiple locations, but most of them were not suitable for various reasons, ranging from its size to the logistics of filming there. On the stunt, Phillips said, "It's on an epic scale with a lot of different railway lines and we can hopefully create a real spectacle." The stunt was filmed at night over several days. Walkinshaw enjoyed filming on location and film something as grand as the train crash. Phillips told a BBC Online reporter that the crew faced multiple challenges with the episode, including making sure that the script "really held water and did justice to the story that we really want to tell." He added that once the crew realised how they would produce the episode, they became excited about filming it. Reflecting on filming the train crash, Walkinshaw commented, "The train crash is big, with weird and wonderful stuff – it was good fun."

When Fletch discovers the news, he joins the paramedics and rushes to the scene of the incident. Walkinshaw explained that Fletch "goes into panic" when he discovers that Tess in on the derailed train. He realises that he has been ignoring his romantic feelings for Tess. The train explodes as Fletch is rescuing Tess, but they appear through the smoke of the explosion. Phillips thought the image was powerful and believed the audience would remember it. While Fletch is saving Tess from the train, Natalie is watching the events on a news report in the ED. She soon realises that Tess is the woman that Fletch had an affair with. Walkinshaw pointed out that in Fletch's final scenes, he faces multiple "realisations" and "conclusions". He has to make a choice about Natalie and Tess, and ends his marriage to Natalie. Walkinshaw opined that Fletch "does the right thing" and said that he and Tess would not be able to pretend to be "'just' friends". He said in an interview for the Casualty website that Fletch is "brave, stupid [and] romantic" and commented, "He loves Natalie for everything she's given him: the support, the family, the love, but his heart is with Tess."

In an emotional conversation with Tess, he tells her that he wants them to be together, although she says that she can't be with him. Walkinshaw described the scene as "emotional" and said, "filming the emotional scenes with Suzanne I found quite easy to do as she's a great actress." Fletch decides to resign from his job in the ED as a result. Walkinshaw that Fletch makes his decision "gallantly" and said that he does "the right thing". He did not believe his character's affair had made him a bad person as he had just acted on his feelings. He thought that Fletch deciding to leave was a selfless act because he had put Tess' feelings before his own. Walkinshaw told Elaine Reilly of What's on TV that Fletch's colleagues would "draw their own conclusions" from Fletch's decision to leave. He pointed out that Fletch has maintained a good relationship with his colleagues. Reflecting on the storyline and Fletch's departure, Phillips commented, "what we want to do is take the audience on a real journey with Fletch and Tess and see those characters forced to face their destinies together". Series producer Erika Hossington told Kilkelly (Digital Spy) that she wanted Fletch and Tess to be involved in the train crash, which she regarded as a "big set piece", because she wanted to involve characters that the audience enjoy in the stunts.

Reflecting on his tenure on the show, Walkinshaw said that he could find a highlight in every day of his work and described the show as "a lovely place to be and work". He also praised his storylines and the people he's worked with, adding that he would miss the friendships he has made. He added that he liked portraying both the lighter, comedic material and the dramatic, emotional material. The actor was also appreciative for the stunts that Fletch was involved in as he understood that nurses do not usually feature outside the ED set. Phillips was disappointed that Fletch would not continue his story on Casualty, but he expected to feel the repercussions of the storyline on the show. Hossington revealed that Fletch's storyline would set up stories for Tess as she deals with the aftermath of her affair with Fletch.

Holby City introduction 
Producers wanted to introduce a new male nurse that could work with Jonny Maconie (Michael Thomson) and "lock horns" with director of nursing Colette Sheward (Louise Delamere). When Walkinshaw told Kent about his intentions to leave in August 2013, he and Simon Harper, the series producer of Holby City, made plans for Fletch to join the spinoff series. Kent explained that this very rarely happens and when it does, they do not normally move to the other show immediately. However, he thought that Fletch was "unique" in how there was a small gap between leaving Casualty and joining Holby City. Harper thought that moving Fletch to Holby City would be risky due to his association with Casualty. Despite this, he felt that Walkinshaw brought "cheek and charm" to the show, which he liked. Walkinshaw was surprised by the plans to move his character, but said he was "very grateful for it" as it meant he could go home each night. On this, he commented, "There's a lot to be said for that." Walkinshaw did not know many cast members before joining the show, but did know Rosie Marcel, who portrays Jac Naylor, well as they worked closely together on The Bill. Writers devised a scene between Walkinshaw and Marcel where they reference their history on The Bill. Marcel felt "lucky" to be allowed to have a scene and described the scene as "really funny". She was pleased that Walkinshaw had joined the cast as she had tried to get him to join for several years and expected him to attract a new audience for the show. When Walkinshaw told Marcel that he would be joining, she joked that she would "make [his] life hell!" A preview of upcoming episodes, including Fletch's introduction, was released on 15 July 2014.

With the announcement that Fletch would join Holby City, Walkinshaw stated that after leaving his job in the ED, Fletch is offered a new job in the hospital. He is offered the position of the ward manager of the Acute Assessment Unit (AAU) after Raf di Lucca (Joe McFadden) complains to Colette about a lack of nurses. CEO Guy Self (John Michie) takes over the decision and hires Fletch without telling Colette. Kent and Harper agreed that Fletch's introduction allows for the AAU to become "fun again". Fletch's new job is a promotion. Walkinshaw said that Fletch would try to be successful and "assert himself a bit more" as he becomes more mature. He added that Fletch would take on the responsibility as a challenge, but said that he could "mess up" like he did on Casualty. Walkinshaw did not expect Fletch's gambling storyline to be continued in Holby City. He also pointed out that Fletch is not in a relationship so could have a love interest. When asked about Fletch's upcoming storylines, Walkinshaw teased stories with Colette, Raf, Harry Tressler (Jules Knight) and Serena Campbell (Catherine Russell).

Since both shows are set in the same hospital, it is expected that characters may know each other. Therefore, Fletch's new colleagues know about his affair with Tess. His superiors, Guy and AAU consultant Ric Griffin (Hugh Quarshie) warn Fletch not to mix his personal and professional lives in his new job. Walkinshaw explained that Fletch expected people to doubt him in his new job and is prepared to "rise to the challenge and move on". Ric already knows Tess, which makes him more cautious of Fletch. Walkinshaw said that when he joins the AAU, "Fletch's card is well and truly marked." However, Ric becomes impressed with Fletch when he performs a difficult procedure.

Fletch tries to prove himself by hiring an agency nurse to help with the workload. Helen Flanagan was cast as Kirsty Brompton, a "lazy and wily" agency nurse who Fletch hires after meeting her in a bar. Kent stated that Flanagan's appearance would be "an episode to watch" and that Kirsty would "ruffle some feathers" with Colette. Colette disagrees with Fletch's decision to hire Kirsty, believing that he has hired her based on her appearance rather than her skills. When the AAU becomes understaffed, Fletch tries to hide this and sort the ward single-handedly, but Colette soon realises the truth.

Colette Sheward 
Writers established a link between Fletch and Colette when it emerges that they were engaged fifteen years previously, but she jilted him on their wedding day. Delamere explained that Colette jilted Fletch because she wanted to explore other things before settling down. The pair have "unresolved issues" which make Fletch's new job difficult. Delamere explained that Fletch would be "an unwelcome blast from the past who gets under Colette's skin!", while Walkinshaw teased that Fletch would have to decide how to create a working relationship with Colette. Guy hires Fletch to annoy Colette, which Fletch fails to realise. Delamere thought that Guy's actions were cruel for Colette. Colette realises Guy's intentions and reacts badly to Fletch's arrival. Fletch hopes for a "fresh start" when he arrives, but struggles with this when he is confronted with Colette. Their meeting is the first time that they have seen each other since Colette jilted Fletch on their wedding day. Walkinshaw told Wilson (What's on TV) that although Fletch and Colette need to have a talk about that day, Fletch wants to get on with his job. He also said that "it's a bit of a shock to both of them" to see each other and there is clear tension between the pair. The actor explained that Fletch decides to deal with his past with Colette and develop a better working relationship with her, but encounters a lot of "bickering and banter". Walkinshaw enjoyed the fun scenes between Fletch and Colette where they argue.

A romantic attraction is developed between Fletch and Colette. Walkinshaw told Kilkelly of Digital Spy that there is an element of "what if?" between Fletch and Colette. Delamere thought there was "great chemistry" between the pair, but understood that Colette needed to be professional. Despite this, the actress opined that Colette should have married Fletch. Colette departed the series in November 2014, ending any potential relationship between Fletch and Colette. Delamere enjoyed working with Walkinshaw and believed that had Fletch and Colette began a relationship, Colette would have "ended up eating him alive if she'd wanted to!"

Raf di Lucca 
Producers developed a friendship between Fletch and registrar Raf di Lucca (McFadden) when he joins Holby City. Moon (Inside Soap) reported that Fletch and Raf would become "firm friends". Walkinshaw told her that they would work well together and support each other. McFadden also confirmed that Fletch would become friends with Raf and said that during Raf's difficult moments, Fletch becomes "a guiding light for him". When Raf confides in Fletch about his marital problems, Fletch agrees to help Raf. He assigns him to a complex case and encourages Raf to focus on his career. McFadden enjoyed working with Walkinshaw and opined that he was enjoyable to spend time with. Reflecting on Fletch and Raf's friendship, Walkinshaw pointed out that Fletch has made Raf more light-hearted, while Raf has matured Fletch.

Fletch and Raf's friendship is tested in May 2016 by the introduction of psychiatrist Naomi Palmer (Lorna Brown). Fletch tries to impress Naomi and decides to ask her on a date, presuming that Raf will babysit his children. Raf becomes irritated by Fletch's behaviour and feels that he is "being taken for granted". He reminds Fletch about his responsibilities at home and Fletch realises how much he needs Raf. Raf later develops an attraction to Naomi as Fletch decides to ask Naomi on a date. Naomi later dumps Fletch without warning after developing an attraction to Raf. Raf feels guilty and tries to hide his feelings for Naomi, although Fletch soon realises. He tells Raf that he will move out of his house, although he changes her mind when they reconcile.

McFadden left the series in 2017 and Raf was killed off in a hospital shooting in December. Fletch struggles to grieve for Raf following his death. A few weeks later, Fletch is sent Raf's record collection as part of his inheritance. A patient then suggests that Raf wants Fletch to complete and order the collection, which he continues to do.

Single fatherhood and poverty 
Fletch's first major storyline in Holby City commenced in January 2015 when his and Natalie's divorce is finalised. Natalie celebrates her divorce with her friend Bex Kimber (Emma Cooke) and they arrive on the AAU, where Fletch is on shift, after Bex is admitted. Natalie reveals that she is moving to Sunderland with their children, having accepted a job there. Fletch is annoyed and speaks to Bex, who explains that Natalie is "deeply unhappy as a result of their marriage breakdown" and needs to start afresh. Fletch then realises how much his affair with Tess has affected Natalie and tells her that he will not stop her moving. Natalie falls unconscious and Raf realises that Natalie has serious bruising on her head. It emerges that Natalie has a bleed on the brain and needs emergency surgery; Fletch is left "in turmoil". Natalie dies as a result of her injuries, leaving Fletch a single father. The divorce left Fletch without any savings so when he becomes a single father, he is left with financial strain. Producers decided to kill off Natalie because it would create several new storylines for Fletch, including his struggle as a single father and his financial struggles, which were shown onscreen.

Evie Fletcher (Macey Chipping), Fletch's eldest daughter, was introduced in April 2015 as part of the storyline. As she joins a new school, Evie is involved in a bus crash and admitted onto the AAU. Fletch orders an MRI scan for Evie when she says that she has a headache, panicking that she could have a brain injury like Natalie. Fletch is then devastated when he discovers that Evie was not involved in the accident and that she was being bullied for being poor, so got off the bus early. Evie confesses that she did not want to worry Fletch, which makes him realise that Evie is aware of his financial struggles. A What's on TV reporter stated that Fletch "feels he's letting his children down". Later, Fletch has to pay for an expensive school trip for Evie amid multiple debts. Jane Hazlegrove, who portrays Kathleen "Dixie" Dixon in Casualty, appears in one episode as part of the storyline. When a patient suggests that Fletch bets on a horse, he asks Dixie to place the bet for him so he can pay for Evie's trip. Dixie is "reluctant" due to Fletch's gambling problem.

Fletch's debts increase when his car is clamped after parking illegally to help a patient. Fletch confesses his financial problems to porter Clifford George (Geff Francis), who becomes a friend for Fletch. Walkinshaw explained that Fletch relates to Clifford as he is a "bloke's bloke" and is trying to help Fletch. He added that Clifford has "no malice" towards Fletch. Clifford has the clamp removed and offers Fletch "a holdall of knocked-off cigarettes" for him to sell. Fletch is hesitant to accept, but does take Clifford's offer. However, Walkinshaw believed that these actions are "not really Fletch". Clifford continues to help Fletch with his problem and they store illegal whiskey in the hospital. They discover a young boy where they have stored the alcohol, and Serena nearly discovers their stash. Clifford later tells Fletch about a pharmaceutical drugs raid from a delivery van and claims that it is a "victimless crime", but Fletch is not interested. Walkinshaw explained that Fletch justifies the raid because Clifford has said that nobody would get hurt.

Writers included an "awful" and "really sad" twist to Fletch's financial storyline when he and his children are evicted from their home. On the twist, Walkinshaw commented, "Fletch is the sort of person who cheers everyone else up when the truth is that inside he's dying." He added that Fletch feels like he has failed his children. When Fletch arrives to work with his belongings, Clifford offers Fletch the chance of assisting in the raid. Walkinshaw said that Fletch is hesitant to get involved in the raid because he is "a decent, honest man" and the raid does not feel right to him. However, he pointed out that Fletch has no other choice but to get involved as he has to support his children. At the end of the day, Fletch and his children have to sleep in "makeshift beds" in the hospital basement. Victoria Wilson (What's on TV) opined that Fletch had "hit rock bottom". When Clifford explains to Fletch what he has to do, Fletch gets anxious and tries to end his involvement. Walkinshaw told Wilson that Fletch ends his involvement because he is uncomfortable with becoming a criminal. Clifford confesses how he owes money to "violent drug dealers" and he needs to repay them, before revealing that they know about Fletch and his children, placing their lives at danger. Fletch panics that his children are in danger, so agrees to help. However, when Fletch's patient deteriorates, he cannot attend the raid. Walkinshaw explained that Fletch "made the right call at the wrong time".

Shortly afterward, a woman is found "badly beaten" outside the hospital entrance and Fletch believes the two incidents are connected. On Fletch's reasons for this, Walkinshaw commented, "there's no such thing as a victimless crime; somebody always gets hurt, somebody always pays." A further twist to the story revealed that the beaten woman is healthcare assistant Adele Effanga (Petra Letang). Fletch is "racked with guilt" from the attack, knowing he is partly responsible for Adele's condition. He asks Clifford to anonymously tell the police the name of a gang member, but Clifford refuses, so Fletch warns Clifford to sort the situation or he will. Clifford then leaves the hospital without telling anyone. A What's on TV reporter said, "it's anyone's guess whether we'll see him again..." Realising what Clifford has done, Fletch confesses the truth to Adele's cousin Mo Effanga (Chizzy Akudolu), who warns that she go to the police if Fletch does not leave Holby in one month. Clifford later returns to the hospital when he is injured in a car accident and Mo does not force Fletch to leave. Fletch and his family are also invited to live with Raf when he discovers they are homeless. Walkinshaw explained that Raf has "taken a lot of weight off [Fletch's] shoulders" by inviting them to live with him. He observed, "It's not a conventional family unit, but it suits them both."

Fletch's single parenthood was explored again in August 2016 when Fletch's children, Evie and Mikey Fletcher (Kai O'Loughlin), appear in the series. Evie is admitted as a patient on the AAU and Mikey arrives shortly afterward. Fletch has to face Mikey's "problematic behaviour" and worries that "what taking his eye off the ball could mean for his family." It emerges that Mikey hurt Evie by pushing her down the stairs. As Evie prepares to be discharged, she tells Serena that she does not want to return home. Fletch also tells Serena that he blames himself for the accident so she reunites Fletch and Evie. Walkinshaw enjoyed working with Chipping and O'Loughlin. He described Chipping as "extraordinary" and "such a lovely actor", and O'Loughlin as "a little Fletch on a hot wash." Walkinshaw joked, "All we've got to do is grow that hair and tease that quiff and he's me." O'Loughlin lives very close to where Walkinshaw was raised and the three actors bonded immediately. The younger actors have conversations with Walkinshaw about trying different methods in their work, which Walkinshaw encourages. Walkinshaw explained that he made a big effort to create a connection between them. He called the actors "adorable" and a delight to work with, commenting, "If I could work with them all the time it would be lovely."

Casualty return and paralysis 
After leaving Casualty, Walkinshaw said that he could return to the show for guest appearances or that characters from the show could appear in Holby City. The actor thought it would be good to appear in some episodes. Plans for Casualty thirtieth anniversary were first announced in 2015 by series producer Erika Hossington, and on 28 June 2016, it was announced that a "dramatic and shocking stunt" would air on 27 August for the show's anniversary. It was also announced that Walkinshaw would reprise his role as Fletch for the episode, alongside two other Holby City cast members. Fletch appears at a surprise party for senior nurse Charlie Fairhead (Derek Thompson), who is celebrating thirty years in the NHS.

On 27 August 2016, it was confirmed that the episode's aftermath would be explored in the following Holby City episode, "Protect and Serve" and that Fletch would be a key character in the episode. In terms of production, the episode is a standalone episode and was filmed out of order from other episodes. In the episode, Fletch struggles to manage the wards following the crash and has to treat Steph Sims (Tonicha Lawrence), the "unstable" woman who caused Fletch's former colleague Connie Beauchamp (Amanda Mealing) to drive her car off the edge of a cliff. Fletch is also treating James Fielding (Kirk Barker), a patient who is obsessed with consultant Bernie Wolfe (Jemma Redgrave). When Fletch notices James' erratic behaviour, he suggests a psychiatric appointment, but Bernie disagrees. James and Steph disappear from the ward and Fletch discovers them in the basement with James threatening Steph with a screwdriver. As Fletch tries to calm him down, James accidentally stabs Fletch in the stomach. Fletch is taken to theatre, where Serena and Bernie save his life. Afterwards, Bernie confides in Serena that she blames herself for Fletch's condition. When asked why Fletch had suffered so much, Walkinshaw replied that it made for more entertaining storylines. He continued, "It is hard, but it shows good strength of character every time he has to pick himself up again." Walkinshaw thought it was realistic for so many bad things to happen to Fletch, but expected that something good would happen to him eventually. Harper explained that because Fletch is an "everyman" and a character who "the audience are always rooting for", it works when several bad things happen to him. He joked that Fletch had become a "punch bag" on the show.

Writers planted a "worrying twist" in the story when Fletch's blood pressure drops as doctors attempt to wake him from his coma. However, when doctors try to awake Fletch again, he successfully awakes. Raf then takes over Fletch's care. Walkinshaw explained that Fletch and Raf's friendship is that close that Raf wants to do anything he can to save Fletch. Fletch's health deteriorates and he falls from his bed and injures himself. As a result, Fletch cannot feel anything in his legs and feet, leaving Raf "alarmed". Raf and Bernie then perform a lumbar puncture on Fletch and he is "terrified" when he cannot feel the needle. Walkinshaw told Wilson (What's on TV) that Fletch panics that he could die and his children would be parentless. Fletch then asks Raf to care for his children if he dies. Walkinshaw described the moment as "emotional" and opined that it is "lovely that two 'blokey' men can be that close and honest with each other". Raf promises to care for the children, but tells Fletch that he will save his life.

Walkinshaw had to lie in bed for most of the story as Fletch was unable to move. He found himself falling asleep between takes as he was still in the bed. The actor felt that being in bed helped him realise how frustrating it would be for Fletch and let his "emotions wash over [him] and come out of [him]." Walkinshaw found working with his co-stars helpful as he could use their performance to boost his performance. He explained that when some actors give a powerful performance for their close-up, but fail to maintain this emotion for his close-up, he can struggle to perform to his best ability. Raf eventually diagnosis Fletch with Guillain–Barré syndrome, but when he treats Fletch for this, the nurse suffers from anaphylactic shock. Walkinshaw stated that Raf's treatment almost kills Fletch. As Fletch continues to recover from his paralysis, he begins physiotheraphy and manages to walk a few steps. However, Fletch tries to do too much and falls, dislocating his shoulder and knocking patient Jay Nevin (Cassidy Little) unconscious. As Jay has a seizure and starts foaming at the mouth, Fletch is forced to help him as he cannot reach the call button. Fletch "hoists" himself from his bed and lays next to Jay, stopping him choking and shouting for help. The aftermath of Fletch's stabbing was filmed before the actual stabbing as it was part of the standalone episode. Because of this, Walkinshaw was required to remember multiple scripts at once while pretending not to know about following episodes onscreen. Series production manager Ali Liddle thought that it was "quite a discipline for [him] to remember".

Walkinshaw reprises his role in Casualty again during its thirty-third series for a two-part crossover episode with Holby City, originally broadcast in March 2019. He returned for another episode during the series, originally broadcast on 13 April 2019. Fletch appears when Charlie reports nurse David Hide (Jason Durr) to him for assault. In the previous episode, David pushes Charlie to the floor in defence after he repeatedly aggressively shoves him. Durr explained that David finds the situation "distressing".

Inheritance 
In December 2016, Nicholas Woodeson was introduced as "cheeky yet vulnerable patient" Artem Chernik, who is a former professional poker player. Artem returns after being admitted following a collapse at the airport. Fletch discovers that he was travelling to see his long-lost daughter and decides to find her. Fletch manages to find Artem's daughter, but she refuses to have contact with him. Artem is later admitted to the AAU again, where he reveals that he won a large amount of money at the casino the previous night. Fletch is "gobsmacked" when Artem reveals he is carrying his winnings in cash. When it is discovered that Artem needs a life-threatening operation, Fletch manages to get him a less risky operation. After much deliberation, Artem agrees to the surgery, but he dies in theatre, leaving Fletch gutted. After learning about Artem's death, Fletch discovers that Artem changed his will and testament before surgery and that he has left everything, including his winnings, to Fletch. Fletch then decides to repay everyone who he has ever borrowed money from. However, a patient makes him realise that he should spend some of the money on himself. Walkinshaw enjoyed working with Woodeson, who he described as "a proper heavyweight", and would often find himself chatting with him in between takes. He believed that their friendship enabled the characters to portray the chemistry that was wanted for the scenes.

On 13 December 2016, it was announced that Emmerdale actress Gemma Oaten would make a guest appearance in the show. Her appearance as Sydney Somers was previewed in a show trailer released in March 2017. It was teased that Sydney would "cause a world of trouble for Fletch due to her connection with someone close to him." Laura-Jayne Tyler of Inside Soap confirmed that Oaten would play an agency nurse who believes that Fletch has money that belongs to her. She added that Sydney would be "fiercely determined to get her hands on it!". Oaten told Tyler that she enjoyed filming with Walkinshaw and learnt a lot from him. Sydney first appears in April 2017. She arrives on the ward as Fletch has "an upbeat outlook on life", which Sydney manages to destroy throughout the day. As Fletch finds out more information about Sydney, he is "dumbstruck" to discover that she is Artem's daughter. Sydney then threatens Fletch with legal action over a claim to Artem's inheritance. Fletch is surprised when Sydney reappears on the AAU the following week. Oaten told Kayleigh Giles of the Daily Express that Fletch is "absolutely gobsmacked" when Sydney returns as he thought she had no more shifts at the hospital. As Fletch prepares to go on holiday with his family, he questions whether he deserves the inheritance.

Producers invited Oaten to reprise her role for a guest appearance in 2018. Sydney returns in a new position. In August 2017, Fletch is promoted to the Director of Nursing, a managerial role in the hospital. As part of the position, Fletch has to deal with nurse shortages. He arranges a meeting with the head of agency staff, who is revealed to be Sydney. Fletch and Sydney clash when he asks for her agency nurses to work for 30 minutes unpaid and she refuses. Annoyed, Fletch says that the hospital will not use their nurses any more, but when Abigail Tait (Olivia Poulet), the hospital's chief executive officer, discovers this, she is "furious" with Fletch. Another incident then forces Abigail to question whether Fletch suits the role of Director of Nursing. However, Fletch and Sydney manage to compromise over the agency staff and he asks her to join him for a drink after work.

Jac Naylor and Abigail Tait 
In an August 2017 interview with Digital Spy, series producer Kate Hall revealed that she had paired Fletch with Jac Naylor, the director of cardiothoracics, for a new storyline as she thought that they had a "palpable" connection. She billed the pairing as "delicious and electric" and compared it to Bruce Willis and Cybill Shepherd in Moonlighting or Cary Grant and Katharine Hepburn. On the comparison, Marcel told Laura-Jayne Tyler, writing for Inside Soap, that she loved playing the Moonlighting aspect of the relationship and that Walkinshaw would be Shepherd to her Willis. Hall confirmed that the storyline would begin on 29 August and teased that the storyline would see Jac "let her guard down" as she starts to grieve for her sister Jasmine. Hall added that the performances between Walkinshaw and Marcel were "mind-blowing" and that it was clear that they had "a really strong connection". In the aforementioned episode, Fletch attends an interview for the Director of Nursing position, but finds himself a "real-life managerial challenge" when he has to find a theatre for a patient. Fletch asks Jac if she will operate on his patient urgently. Fletch receives the promotion to Director of Nursing and is moved to Darwin ward. Walkinshaw hoped that with his promotion, Fletch could "bring a bit of normal-speak to the boardroom, something we can understand."

Walkinshaw pointed out that Jac is a completely person to Fletch and noted that Jac is used to telling a man off as he stands opposite her desk and reminding them who is in charge. Walkinshaw thought the pairing would be "interesting" as Jac is very formidable and Fletch is not afraid to challenge her. He hoped for clashes between the pair as well as some nicer scenes. Fletch serves as a "loyal friend" to Jac and she helps him when he struggles with the hospital's winter crisis. In February 2018, Fletch and Jac's relationship is explored again. When Fletch receives a vinyl collection in Raf's will, Jac takes a "rare" vinyl record. Fletch does not realise and decides to buy the record. Jac's mentee, Frieda Petrenko (Olga Fedori), and daughter, Emma Naylor-Maconie (Darcey Burke), soon realise that Jac has developed feelings for Fletch. Fletch, who is struggling in the wake of the recent hospital shooting, installs extra security measures in the hospital. However, the measures result in a bike courier, who has delivered a replacement record to Jac, being admitted to Darwin ward. Fletch has also been "snooping" on Evie's phone, which Jac warns him about. She helps Fletch and Evie bond. Fletch and Jac later arrange a date to the zoo with their children. However, they have to cancel when there is a shortage of staff at the hospital. As Fletch assists Jac in surgery, he discovers that she planned to leave Holby before the shooting. He questions why she didn't leave. A What's on TV reporter thought that it was "obvious [that] Jac has eyes for Fletch". Jac is told that she has four weeks of holiday available to take and despite her growing feelings for Fletch, she leaves.

Abigail Tait (Poulet), the hospital's new CEO, is introduced in April 2018. She clashes with Fletch over the care of a patient as he struggles in the absence of Jac. Fletch accuses Abigail of undermining patient care to "put herself on the map", so Abigail warns Fletch and defends her actions. When Fletch and Abigail clash again over patient care, he questions the CEO's intentions. Abigail later tasks Fletch with choosing a new senior staff nurse for the AAU. He wants Donna to take on the role, but Abigail wants to go through an interview process, causing them to argue. A What's on TV journalist observed that "Fletch and Abigail rub each other up the wrong way" in the episode. Abigail felt bad for her actions and asked Fletch to go for a drink after work. They chat and realise that they should work together. Jazmin Duribe of the Daily Star pointed out that there was "obvious chemistry" between the pair and suggested that Fletch could "replace" Jac with Abigail. When Fletch and Sydney disagree over the agency staffing problem, Abigail warns Fletch to fix the problem and later suggests he is not suitable to his job. Fletch later has sex with a "mystery hot blonde" woman, who is revealed to be Abigail in a "shocking twist", despite his involvement with Jac.

Marcel revealed in an Inside Soap interview that she and Walkinshaw did not want to be paired together as they felt that the characters would not suit. She hoped that they would not share a kiss and compared it to "snogging my brother!" After an extended period of leave, Jac returns to the show in June 2018. Fletch is shocked to see Jac back at the hospital. Marcel thought that it was "obvious" that Fletch had missed Jac and thought that it was nice. On Fletch and Jac's relationship, the actress commented, "Fletch suffers her and she knows he suffers her". She also told Tyler (Inside Soap) that Jac does not want to burden Fletch with her problems as she is a "complicated soul". However, it is soon revealed that Jac has not returned for Fletch, but for an urgent operation, which Fletch does not agree with. They share a heart-to-heart as Jac confides in Fletch over her feelings towards her health. Following Jac's return, Fletch and Abigail's relationship is challenged, and they realise their feelings for each other. After a heavy focus on Fletch and Abigail's relationship, his immediate relationship with Jac is revisited in August. When an agency nurse does not arrive for an operation that Jac is leading, she orders Fletch to assist her in theatre, but he is distracted by his personal life. This leads to the pair having a "blazing row". As Fletch goes to reconcile with Jac, he discovers her unconscious and "raises the alarm".

Introduction of father 
A promotional trailer, displaying upcoming scenes in the show, was released on 5 June 2018. The trailer revealed that Fletch's father would be introduced to the series. Inside Soap confirmed the news, reporting that Jesse Birdsall had been cast as Fletch's estranged father, Steven Fletcher. They stated that there would not be a happy reunion for father and son and revealed that Fletch would stop Steven from seeing his family. Fletch's father was previously mentioned in December 2016 when he contacts Fletch after multiple years without contact. Steven arrives as Fletch is experiencing "an emotionally exhausting day". Fletch has to leave Evie in charge of his youngest child, Theo Fletcher (Stanley Rabbetts), while he goes to work. However, when Theo is admitted alone onto the AAU with a broken finger, Fletch starts to worry and is told that social services will be getting involved. Evie arrives at the hospital with Steven, who Fletch is shocked to see, having not seen him for 17 years. Fletch tries to send Steven away, but he and Evie bond as Steven fixes Fletch's car. Annoyed that Fletch won't let Steven stay, Evie reminds Fletch of his misdemeanours as a parent, including his affair with Tess. Fletch then agrees to let Steven meet his children, although Haasler, writing for the Metro, thought that Fletch still appeared "extremely wary" about Steven. Social services later inform Fletch that he can keep his children, but will have to attend a parenting course and that he will be "monitored" by social services.

Reception 
Walkinshaw was nominated for "Best Actor" at the 2015 TV Choice Awards. Fletch's poverty storyline was shortlisted at the 2016 Inside Soap Awards under the "Best Drama Storyline" category, but lost out to Arthur Digby's (Rob Ostlere) death. Walkinshaw was nominated for Best Drama Star at the 2020 Inside Soap Awards.

David Butcher of the Radio Times branded Fletch "a cheeky nurse keeping up the jack-the-lad quota now Lennie [sic] has left." Tyler (Inside Soap) described Fletch as "gorgeous". A What's on TV reporter called Fletch "a good nurse but 'a lousy husband'. On Fletch, a columinst from What's on TV commented, "As ward manager of Holby's AAU, Adrian 'Fletch' Fletcher is dedicated to his job, running a tight ship at work while raising four kids as a single dad."

Sophie Dainty of Digital Spy thought that Fletch and Tess' affair was his biggest storyline in Casualty. Tyler (Inside Soap) said that Fletch and Tess' affair had been "a huge talking point". Wilson (What's on TV) dubbed Fletch a "love-rat" and observed that Fletch had "caused quite a stir on the ED". Walkinshaw received a mixed response to Fletch and Tess' affair, commenting, "It's like Marmite – people either love it or hate it." Walkinshaw received a positive reaction the news he was moving to Holby City with some Casualty fans deciding to start watching Holby City as a result of the move. While the actor predicted some bad response, he told Wilson (What's on TV) that he had received a good response to his departure, with some viewers opining that Fletch and Tess could have stayed in a relationship. Producer Harper thought that Fletch's transition to Holby City had played out excellently and called Fletch a "fantastic" character. He added that Walkinshaw had become a "great company member, one of the gang on screen and off."

Delamere revealed that Fletch and Colette's relationship had been well received by fans of the drama. Wilson of What's on TV sympathised with the character, commenting, "as if he hasn’t been through enough in his life, he recently got stabbed by a patient". She also described Fletch asking Raf to care for his children if he dies as "heart-breaking". Walkinshaw also received positive feedback to his onscreen chemistry with Woodeson (Artem Chernik). Multiple members of Holby City cast and crew told Haasler for her Holby City book how good Walkinshaw is on the show, especially with how he works with the camera.

References

Bibliography

External links 

Adrian Fletcher at BBC Online

Casualty (TV series) characters
Holby City characters
Fictional nurses
Television characters introduced in 2012
Fictional taxi drivers
Fictional homeless people
Crossover characters in television
Male characters in television